

Days of the month
<div id="31_July_2007"> </div id>

31 July 2007 (Tuesday)

Baseball:
The Boston Red Sox acquire former Cy Young Award-winning pitcher Éric Gagné from the Texas Rangers in exchange for pitcher Kason Gabbard and two minor-league outfielders. (AP via Yahoo)
The Rangers also trade first baseman Mark Teixeira and pitcher Ron Mahay to the Atlanta Braves for rookie catcher Jarrod Saltalamacchia and four minor-leaguers. (AP via Yahoo)
Basketball:
National Basketball Association:
The Boston Celtics trade seven players to the Minnesota Timberwolves for 10-time all-star Kevin Garnett. It is the first time in NBA history so many players have been traded for a single player. The Timberwolves will receive Al Jefferson, Ryan Gomes, Gerald Green, Sebastian Telfair, Theo Ratliff, and 2 first-round daft picks. (AP via Yahoo)

FIBA Asia Championship quarterfinals at Tokushima, Japan:
Group E:  76–64 
Group E:  90–68 
Group F:  70–65 
Group F:  93–85 

Cricket:
Indian cricket team in England in 2007
2nd Test-5th Day: 481 & 73/3 (24.1 ov.)  198 & 355 beat by 7 wickets
 leads series 1–0.

<div id="30_July_2007"> </div id>

30 July 2007 (Monday)

Basketball: FIBA Asia Championship at Tokushima, Japan:
Group A:  77–68 
Group A:  84–76 
Jordan advances to the quarterfinals.
Group B:  105–64 
Lebanon advances to the quarterfinals.
Group B:  101–48 
Group C:  72–66 
Group C:  76–69 
Qatar wins Group C.
Group D:  98–81 
Chinese Taipei advances to the quarterfinals.
Group D:  89–79 
American football
Head coach Bill Walsh, who led the San Francisco 49ers to three Super Bowls in 10 seasons in the 1980s and created the modern West Coast offense, dies after a battle with leukemia at his home in Stanford, California, at the age of 75. (ESPN)
Cricket:
Indian cricket team in England in 2007
2nd Test-4th Day: 198 & 355 lead  481 & 10/0 (3 ov.) by 63 runs

<div id="29_July_2007"> </div id>

29 July 2007 (Sunday)

Baseball: July 29 – Cal Ripken Jr. and Tony Gwynn were inducted into the Baseball Hall of Fame.
Auto racing:
NASCAR: Allstate 400 at The Brickyard in Speedway, Indiana.
(1) Tony Stewart (2) Juan Pablo Montoya  (3) Jeff Gordon
Champ Car: San Jose Grand Prix in San Jose, California, USA.
(1) Robert Doornbos  (2) Neel Jani  (3) Oriol Servia 
Cycling: 2007 Tour de France – Stage 20 – Marcoussis – Paris-Champs-Élysées (146 km)
Alberto Contador  (DSC) wins the Tour in 91 hours and 26 seconds, 23 seconds ahead of Cadel Evans  and 31 seconds ahead of Levi Leipheimer . This was Contador's first attempt at the Tour. (leTour.fr)
Basketball: FIBA Asia Championship at Tokushima, Japan:
Group A:  79–74 
China is eliminated from championship contention.
Group A:  60–54 
Group B:  69–68  – Rashid Alrabah's missed lay-up at the buzzer gave the game to UAE.
Kuwait is eliminated from championship contention.
Group B:  77–67 
Group C:  97–74 
Group C:  86–45 
India and Indonesia are eliminated from championship contention.
Qatar and Kazakhstan advance to the quarterfinals.
Group D:  104–100  – Yi Ting Lo's freethrow gave the game out of reach for the Syrians.
Syria is eliminated from championship contention.
Group D:  85–70 
Football (soccer): 2007 AFC Asian Cup finals
 1–0  at Jakarta
Cricket:
Indian cricket team in England in 2007
2nd Test-3rd Day: 481 lead  198 & 43/0 (16 ov.) by 240 runs

<div id="28_July_2007"> </div id>

28 July 2007 (Saturday)

Cycling: 2007 Tour de France – Stage 19 – Cognac – Angoulême (55 km) Individual time trial
(leTour.fr)
Basketball: FIBA Asia Championship at Tokushima, Japan:
Group A:  78–65 
Group A:  75–69  – in the only non-blowout game on the first day, the Philippines cut the Iranian lead from 16 to one point but a technical foul on Philippine coach Chot Reyes after the two-minute warning turned the tide in favor of the Iranians.
Group B:  109–66 
Group B:  104–59 
Group C:  106–49 
Group C:  107–53 
Group D:  107–67 
Group D:  99–60 
Cricket:
Indian cricket team in England in 2007
2nd Test-2nd Day: 254/3 (79 ov.) lead  198 by 55 runs
Football (soccer): 2007 AFC Asian Cup third-place match
 0–0 (aet)  at Palembang
 won via penalties, 6–5.

<div id="27_July_2007"> </div id>

27 July 2007 (Friday)

Baseball: Barry Bonds hits his 754th career home run in the first inning against the Florida Marlins at AT&T Park.
Cycling: 2007 Tour de France – Stage 18 – Cahors – Angoulême (211 km)
(leTour.fr)
Cricket:
Indian cricket team in England in 2007
2nd Test-1st Day: 169/7 (55 ov.) lead  by 169 runs

<div id="26_July_2007"> </div id>

26 July 2007 (Thursday)

College basketball: Wake Forest men's head coach Skip Prosser dies of an apparent heart attack. (AP via Yahoo)
Cricket: Former Indian fast bowler Javagal Srinath's name is not included in the ICC match referees list for the upcoming Twenty20 World Championship to be contested in South Africa
Cycling: 2007 Tour de France – Stage 17 – Pau – Castelsarrasin (188 km)
(leTour.fr)

<div id="25_July_2007"> </div id>

25 July 2007 (Wednesday)

Auto racing: NASCAR NEXTEL Cup team Robert Yates Racing announces it will merge operations with Champ Car stalwart Newman/Haas/Lanigan Racing.
Cycling: 2007 Tour de France – Stage 16 – Orthez – Gourette–Col d'Aubisque (218 km)
 Yellow jersey wearer  Michael Rasmussen  wins the stage. (leTour.fr) Shortly afterwards, his Rabobank team announces it has withdrawn him from the Tour for violation of team rules, linked to his prior failure to notify the team's directeur sportif of his whereabouts and missing several doping tests. He had been previously kicked off the Danish national cycling team for the same reason. (ESPN)
Italian rider Cristian Moreni is announced to have failed a doping test after Stage 11. At the end of Stage 16, he is led away for questioning by French police, who also conduct a raid on the hotel used that day by his Cofidis team. The team pulls out of the Tour.(Fox News)
Football (soccer): 2007 AFC Asian Cup semifinals
 0–0 (aet)  at Kuala Lumpur
 won via penalties, 4–3.
 3–2  at Hanoi
Basketball: Philippine NCAA end of first round of eliminations:
Colegio de San Juan de Letran 70, San Beda College 69
José Rizal University 74, College of Saint Benilde 63
Both Letran and San Beda finished on top of the standings with 5–1 records; host JRU and San Sebastian College – Recoletos finished tied for third at 3–3. Trailing are Mapua and University of Perpetual Help with 2–4 records and St. Benilde with 1–5.
Cricket:
Bangladesh cricket team in Sri Lanka in 2007
3rd ODI: 196 (39.5/40 ov.) beat  157 (37.1/40 ov.) by 39 runs

<div id="24_July_2007"> </div id>

24 July 2007 (Tuesday)

Auto racing: NASCAR NEXTEL Cup teams DEI and Ginn Racing officially merge with the #01 team with Mark Martin, Regan Smith and Aric Almirola joining DEI and the points earned by the #13 car transferred to the DEI #15 team driven by Paul Menard.
Basketball: NBA commissioner David Stern says the scandal involving former official Tim Donaghy is an isolated incident. (AP via Yahoo)
Cycling: 2007 Tour de France:
On the final rest day, it was announced that  has withdrawn their entire team after it was discovered that two-time stage winner Alexander Vinokourov  had been found guilty of blood doping after a test. (letour.fr)
Baseball:
Houston Astros second baseman Craig Biggio, who had collected his 3,000th hit on June 28, announces that he will retire at the end of the 2007 MLB season. (MLB.com)

<div id="23_July_2007"> </div id>

23 July 2007 (Monday)

Baseball: In his first game since being diagnosed with lymphoma last year, Boston Red Sox pitcher Jon Lester gives up two runs on five hits in six innings in Boston's 6–2 win over the Cleveland Indians. (Ticker via Yahoo)
Cycling: 2007 Tour de France – Stage 15 – Foix – Loudenvielle (196 km)
(leTour.fr)
American football: NFL commissioner Roger Goodell orders Atlanta Falcons quarterback Michael Vick not to report to training camp while he continues to face charges of illegal dog fighting and animal abuse. (AP via Yahoo)
Cricket:
Indian cricket team in England in 2007
1st Test-5th Day: 298 & 282 drew  201 & 282/9 (96 ov.)

<div id="22_July_2007"> </div id>

22 July 2007 (Sunday)

Baseball: Mike Coolbaugh, first-base coach with the Tulsa Drillers of the Double-A Texas League, dies after getting hit in the head with a line drive at a game in North Little Rock, Arkansas. (AP via Yahoo)
Auto racing:
Formula One: European Grand Prix at Nürburg, Germany.
(1) Fernando Alonso  (2) Felipe Massa  (3) Mark Webber 
IRL: Honda 200 at Troy Township, Morrow County, Ohio.
(1) Scott Dixon  (2) Dario Franchitti  (3) Hélio Castroneves 
Champ Car: West Edmonton Mall Grand Prix in Edmonton, Alberta, Canada.
(1) Sébastien Bourdais  (2) Justin Wilson  (3) Graham Rahal 
Cycling: 2007 Tour de France – Stage 14 – Mazamet – Plateau-de-Beille (197 km)
(leTour.fr)
Golf: 2007 Open Championship
Pádraig Harrington  defeats Sergio García  in a four-hole playoff to win the Open Championship in Carnoustie, Scotland. Harrington becomes the first European-based player to win the claret jug since Paul Lawrie won in 1999, also in a playoff at Carnoustie Golf Links.
Cricket:
Indian cricket team in England in 2007
1st Test-4th Day: 298 & 282 leads  201 & 137/3 (41 ov.) by 243 runs
Football (soccer): 2007 AFC Asian Cup quarterfinals
 0–0 (aet)  at Kuala Lumpur
 won via penalties, 4–2.
 2–1  at Jakarta
Basketball: FIBA Under-19 World Championship at Serbia
Final:  74–69 
Third-place:  75–67 
English billiards: World Professional Billiards Championship in England:
Final: Mike Russell  2166–1710 Chris Shutt 

<div id="21_July_2007"> </div id>

21 July 2007 (Saturday)

Cycling: 2007 Tour de France – Stage 13 – Albi (54 km) Individual time trial
(leTour.fr)
Rugby union:
2007 Tri Nations
 26–12  at Eden Park, Auckland — Dan Carter's seven penalties lead the All Blacks to their third consecutive Tri Nations crown. They also retain the Bledisloe Cup.
Cricket:
Indian cricket team in England in 2007
1st Test-3rd Day: 298 & 77/2 (27 ov.) leads  201 by 174 runs
Football (soccer): 2007 AFC Asian Cup quarterfinals
 1–1 (aet)  at Hanoi
 won via penalties, 4–3.
 2–0  at Bangkok

<div id="20_July_2007"> </div id>

20 July 2007 (Friday)

Basketball:
The National Basketball Association acknowledges that the FBI is investigating whether referee Tim Donaghy bet on NBA games, including those he officiated.(AP via Yahoo!)
Philippine Basketball Association Fiesta Conference Finals at the Cuneta Astrodome, Pasay:
Alaska Aces 99, Talk 'N Text Phone Pals 96, Alaska wins series, 4–3
Cycling: 2007 Tour de France – Stage 12 – Montpellier – Castres (179 km)
(leTour.fr)
Cricket:
Indian cricket team in England in 2007
1st Test-2nd Day: 298 lead  145/4 (57 ov.) by 153 runs
Bangladesh cricket team in Sri Lanka in 2007
 234/6 (50 ov.) beat  164 (40.3 ov.) by 70 runs

<div id="19_July_2007"> </div id>

19 July 2007 (Thursday)

Cycling: 2007 Tour de France – Stage 11 – Marseille – Montpellier (182.5 km)
(leTour.fr)
Cricket:
Indian cricket team in England in 2007
1st Test-1st Day: 268/4 lead  by 268 runs

<div id="18_July_2007"> </div id>

Baseball:
Barry Bonds hits two home runs, but his San Francisco Giants lose to the Chicago Cubs, 9–8. The two home runs give Bonds 71 multi-home run games in his career, one behind the record of 72 hit by Babe Ruth, and gives him 753 home runs for his career, two behind the record of Henry Aaron. Bonds's season total of 19 home runs also surpasses the record of 18 home runs hit by Carlton Fisk in a year in which the player turned at least 43 years old. He is two home runs behind Fisk's record of 70 home runs hit by a player after he turned 40.
Poker: 2007 World Series of Poker Main Event:
Jerry Yang defeats Tuan Lam in the final hand of the Main Event with a miracle Six of Hearts on the river to complete a five-through-nine straight and overcome Lam's pair of Queens to claim the $8.25 million (US) first prize.
Cycling: 2007 Tour de France – Stage 10 – Tallard – Marseille (229 km)
(leTour.fr)

18 July 2007 (Wednesday)

<div id="17_July_2007"> </div id>

17 July 2007 (Tuesday)

Auto racing:
NASCAR NEXTEL Cup team Ginn Racing makes a major shakeup:
 They release drivers Sterling Marlin and Joe Nemechek;
 Closes down the shop for their #13 car due to a lack of sponsorship;
 Announced Regan Smith will move into the #14 car for the rest of the 2007 season;
 Sign former Joe Gibbs Racing driver Aric Almirola to drive part-time for the rest of the season with Mark Martin in the #01 car. Ginn Racing Press Release
Cycling: 2007 Tour de France – Stage 9 – Val-d'Isère – Briançon (159.5 km)
(leTour.fr)
National Football League
A federal grand jury indicts Atlanta Falcons quarterback Michael Vick and three other men on charges of running a dogfighting operation. (AP via Yahoo)
The Miami Dolphins release quarterback Daunte Culpepper. (AP via Yahoo)

<div id="16_July_2007"> </div id>

16 July 2007 (Monday)

Cricket
 has been dropped out of the ICC Test Championship because they only played 8 Tests in the last 3 years. The annual update of the Test Championship that gets rid of all results that happened before the last three years to make the table reflect current form which usually happens every August 1 happened now because there are no Test Series to be completed ahead of that date. Revised Standings and Full Story

<div id="15_July_2007"> </div id>

15 July 2007 (Sunday)

Football (soccer): 2007 Copa América final at Venezuela:
 3–0  at Maracaibo
Auto racing:
IRL: Firestone Indy 200 at Gladeville, Tennessee (postponed from July 14).
(1) Scott Dixon  (2) Dario Franchitti  (3) Danica Patrick 
NASCAR: USG Sheetrock 400 at Joliet, Illinois.
(1) Tony Stewart (2) Matt Kenseth (3) Carl Edwards
Stewart breaks his 20-race losing streak with the win.

Cycling: 2007 Tour de France – Stage 8 – Le Grand-Bornand – Tignes (165 km)
Michael Rasmussen (Rabobank) wins the stage in 4:49:40 and takes the lead both in the general classification and the mountains classification, finishing the stage ahead of Iban Mayo (Saunier Duval–Prodir) (+2'47") and Alejandro Valverde (Caisse d'Epargne). In the GC, Rasmussen leads in 39:37:42, 43 seconds ahead of Linus Gerdemann, 2'39" ahead of Mayo, and 2'51" ahead of Valverde. Rest day tomorrow. (leTour.fr)
Basketball: Manila Invitational at the Araneta Coliseum, Quezon City
Final:  87–81 
Third-place game:  90–85 
American football
World Cup – Kawasaki, Japan:
Final:  USA 23–20 Japan  (OT)
Cricket:
Quadrangular Series in Ireland in 2007
6th ODI: 222/7 (50 ov.) beat  199 (49.3 ov.) by 23 runs
 won the quadrangular series by 1 point.
Baseball:
The Philadelphia Phillies become the first MLB franchise to lose 10,000 games, falling to the St. Louis Cardinals by a score of 10–2.

<div id="14_July_2007"> </div id>

14 July 2007 (Saturday)

Football (soccer): 2007 Copa América third place match at Venezuela:
 3–1  at Caracas
Cycling: 2007 Tour de France – Stage 7 – Bourg-en-Bresse – Le Grand-Bornand (197 km)
In the first mountain stage of this year's tour, Linus Gerdemann (T-Mobile) wins the stage and becomes the new leader of the general classification with a stage time of 4:53:13, followed today by Iñigo Landaluze in +40" and David de la Fuente (Saunier Duval–Prodir) in +1'39". In the GC, Gerdemann leads in 34:43:40, ahead of Landaluze (+1'24") and de la Fuente (+2'45"). Previous leader Fabian Cancellara goes down to 108th place. (leTour.fr)
Cricket:
Bangladesh cricket team in Sri Lanka in 2007
3rd Test-4th Day:  500/4 (dec) beat  131 & 176 (59 ov.) by an innings and 193 runs. Sri Lankan off spinner Muttiah Muralitharan becomes the second bowler in history, after Shane Warne, to collect 700 Test wickets.
Rugby union:
2007 Tri Nations
 33–6  at Jade Stadium, Christchurch — The All Blacks score three tries in the last 12 minutes to pull away from what was widely considered a Springboks "B" side. This sets up a winner-take-all showdown between the All Blacks and the  Wallabies on July 21 in Auckland, with the Tri Nations crown and the Bledisloe Cup at stake.
American football:
World Cup – Kawasaki, Japan:
5th Place Game:  0–3 South Korea 
3rd Place Game:  0–7 Germany 

<div id="13_July_2007"> </div id>

13 July 2007 (Friday)

The Fifteenth Pan American Games begin in Rio de Janeiro, Brazil. (Official Website)
Cycling: 2007 Tour de France – Stage 6 – Semur-en-Auxois – Bourg-en-Bresse (200 km)
In the last stage before the tour will enter the Alps, Tom Boonen (Quick-Step–Innergetic) sprints to his first stagewin of the Tour in two years. He finished in 5h 20'29" followed by Óscar Freire (Rabobank) and Erik Zabel (Team Milram). Boonen takes over the lead in the Points classification and the top 5 of the General classification remains unchanged. (leTour.fr)

<div id="12_July_2007"> </div id>

12 July 2007 (Thursday)

 Cycling: 2007 Tour de France – Stage 5 – Chablis – Autun (182.5 km)
 Filippo Pozzato (Liquigas) won the stage in a time of 4:39:01 followed by Óscar Freire (Rabobank) and Daniele Bennati (Lampre–Fondital) in the same time. In the GC Fabian Cancellara (Team CSC) keeps wearing the yellow jersey with a total time of 24h 28'66", followed by Andreas Klöden (Astana Team) and Pozatto takes 3rd place. Alexander Vinokourov crashed before the final climb of the day and lost precious time in his attempt to win the Tour this year. (leTour.fr)
 Cricket:
 Bangladesh cricket team in Sri Lanka in 2007
 3rd Test-2nd Day: 131 lead  30/0 (8.4 ov.) by 101 runs
 Quadrangular Series in Ireland in 2007
  165/6 (29.5/30 ov.) beat  152/7 (30/30 ov.) by 4 wickets (D/L)
 American Football:
 World Cup – Kawasaki, Japan:
  Sweden 0–48 Japan 
  USA 33–7 Germany 

<div id="11_July_2007"> </div id>

11 July 2007 (Wednesday)

Football (soccer): 2007 Copa América semifinals at Venezuela:
 0–3  at Puerto Ordaz
Cycling: 2007 Tour de France – Stage 4 – Villers-Cotterêts – Joigny (193 km)
Thor Hushovd (Crédit Agricole) wins the stage in 4:37:47, followed by Robert Hunter (Barloworld), and Óscar Freire (Rabobank) in the same time. In the GC, Fabian Cancellara (Team CSC) retains the yellow jersey for another day, in 19:49:55, followed by Hushovd (+29"), Andreas Klöden (Astana Team) (+33") and David Millar (Saunier Duval–Prodir)  in +41".(leTour.fr)
Cricket:
Bangladesh cricket team in Sri Lanka in 2007
3rd Test-1st Day: 72/4 (29 ov.) lead  by 72 runs
Quadrangular Series in Ireland in 2007
 210/8 (50 ov.) beat  209/6 (50 ov.) by 1 run

<div id="10_July_2007"> </div id>

10 July 2007 (Tuesday)

Football (soccer): 2007 Copa América semifinals at Venezuela:
 2–2 (aet)  at Maracaibo
 won via penalties, 4–5.
Cycling: 2007 Tour de France – Stage 3 – Waregem – Compiègne (236 km)
The longest stage in this year's Tour is won by Fabian Cancellara (Team CSC) in 6:36:15, who retains the yellow jersey with a total time of 15:12:08 in the GC. Erik Zabel (Team Milram) and Danilo Napolitano (Lampre–Fondital) finished the stage in the same time. In the GC, Cancellara is pursued by Andreas Klöden (Astana Team) in +33", David Millar (Saunier Duval–Prodir) in +41", George Hincapie (Discovery Channel) in +43", and Bradley Wiggins (Cofidis), also in +43". (leTour.fr)
Baseball:
Major League Baseball All-Star Game at AT&T Park, San Francisco, California
 American League 5, National League 4. Ichiro Suzuki of the Seattle Mariners earns MVP honors with a 3-for-3 performance, capped off with the first inside-the-park home run in All-Star Game history.
Basketball:
William Jones Cup at Taipei, Republic of China:
 Universiade team 102–101 (OT) 
 85–77  – Lebanon takes second place honors
 107–90  – Despite losing the game, the Philippines takes third place honors after a logjam of teams with 5–4 records since the Philippines beat all of their opponents with 5–4 records
 91–74 Athletes in Action 
 82–59  – Korea gave the Taiwanese a taste of what will happen at the Asian Championships in which they're bracketed at the same group.
Cricket:
Quadrangular Series in Ireland in 2007:
1st ODI: 82/0 (14.3 ov.) beat  80 (31.2 ov.) by 10 wickets
American Football:
World Cup – Kawasaki, Japan:
 Sweden 16–14 France 
 USA 77–0 South Korea 

<div id="9_July_2007"> </div id>

9 July 2007 (Monday)

Baseball:
2007 State Farm Home Run Derby: Vladimir Guerrero of the Los Angeles Angels wins, defeating Alex Ríos of the Toronto Blue Jays in the final round.
Basketball:
William Jones Cup at Taipei, Republic of China:
 82–74 Universiade team 
 72–71  – Jordan clinch their first William Jones Cup championship.
 88–80 
 81–78 
 83–72 Athletes in Action 
Cycling: 2007 Tour de France – Stage 2 – Dunkerque – Ghent (168.5 km)
Gert Steegmans (QSI) outsprints his teammate Tom Boonen to win the stage finishing in their native Belgium in 3:48:22. A massive pile-up involving some 170 of the riders 2 km from the finish line means that the whole peloton get the same time, as allowed by the rules as they were within 3 km of the finish. In the GC, Fabian Cancellara retains the yellow jersey for the third day, with a time of 8:36:13. (leTour.fr)

<div id="8_July_2007"> </div id>

8 July 2007 (Sunday)

Football (soccer): 2007 Copa América quarterfinals at Venezuela:
 6–0  at Maturín
 4–0  at Barquisimeto
Auto racing:
Formula One: British Grand Prix at Silverstone, England.
(1) Kimi Räikkönen  (2) Fernando Alonso  (3) Lewis Hamilton 
Champ Car: Grand Prix of Toronto in Toronto, Ontario, Canada.
(1) Will Power  (2) Neel Jani  (3) Justin Wilson 
IRL: Camping World Watkins Glen Grand Prix at Watkins Glen, New York.
(1) Scott Dixon  (2) Sam Hornish Jr.  (3) Dario Franchitti 
Cycling: 2007 Tour de France – Stage 1 – London – Canterbury (203 km)
Robbie McEwen (Predictor-Lotto), at the back of the peloton with 5 km to go, surges through in the last 100 metres to win the stage in 4:39:01, followed by Thor Hushovd (Crédit Agricole) and Tom Boonen (QSI). In the GC, Fabian Cancellara (Team CSC) retains the yellow jersey as leader of the general classification in 4:47:51, followed by Andreas Klöden (Astana Team) in +13", David Millar (Saunier Duval–Prodir) in +21" (leading the King of the Mountains competition), George Hincapie (Discovery Channel Pro Cycling Team) in +23", and Bradley Wiggins (Cofidis) in +23". (leTour.fr)
Basketball:
William Jones Cup at Taipei, Republic of China:
 Athletes in Action 108–83 Universiade team 
 73–69 
 82–60 
 82–64  – ESPN Star Sports' coverage being produced by its Taiwanese unit was cut off to give way to the British Grand Prix when Chinese Taipei was trailing by 20 points with 3 minutes to go in the fourth quarter.
 91–85 
Major League Baseball:
The Philadelphia Phillies defeat the Colorado Rockies, 6–5, to temporarily avoid becoming the first MLB team to lose 10,000 games in its history before the 2007 All-Star Break. No one was hurt.
Tennis: 2007 Wimbledon Gentlemen's Singles Final:
 Roger Federer def.  Rafael Nadal 7–6(7), 4–6, 7–6(3), 2–6, 6–2

<div id="7_July_2007"> </div id>

7 July 2007 (Saturday)

Football (soccer): 2007 Copa América quarterfinals at Venezuela:
 4–1  at San Cristóbal
 6–1  at Puerto la Cruz
Baseball:
Pitcher Érik Bédard of the Baltimore Orioles faces the minimum 27 batters and strikes out 15 in a 3–0 win over the Texas Rangers. Bédard gives up two hits, both of which are followed by double plays. (AP via Yahoo)
Auto racing:
NASCAR Nextel Cup: Pepsi 400 at Daytona Beach, Florida.
(1) Jamie McMurray  (2) Kyle Busch  (3) Kurt Busch
The photo finish (0.05 seconds) is the second closest in NASCAR history.

Cycling: 2007 Tour de France – Prologue – London (7.9 km) Individual time trial
GC: 1. Fabian Cancellara (Team CSC) 8'50"; 2. Andreas Klöden (Astana Team) +13"; 3. George Hincapie (Discovery Channel Pro Cycling Team) +23"; 4. Bradley Wiggins (Cofidis) +23" (leTour.fr)
Basketball:
William Jones Cup at Taipei, Republic of China:
 72–68 
 Athletes in Action 92–78 
 89–79 
 102–58 Universiade team 
 75–70 
Cricket:
West Indian cricket team in England in 2007
3rd ODI: 289/5 (50 ov.) beat  196 (44.2 ov.) by 93 runs
Chris Gayle goes past 6000 career ODI runs.
 win the series 2–1 with none to play.
Rugby union:
2007 Tri Nations
 25–17  at Telstra Stadium, Sydney — The Springboks, fielding what was widely thought to be a "B team", score two tries in the first seven minutes and take a 17–0 lead after 16 minutes. The Wallabies come back to give longtime icons George Gregan and Stephen Larkham a win in their last game for the Wallabies on Australian soil.
Tennis: 2007 Wimbledon, London, England
Ladies' Singles Final:
(23)  Venus Williams def. (18)  Marion Bartoli, 6–4, 6–1
Men's Singles Semifinals:
(1)  Roger Federer def. (12)  Richard Gasquet, 7–5, 6–3, 6–4
(2)  Rafael Nadal def. (4)  Novak Djokovic, 3–6, 6–1, 4–1 ret. (inj)

<div id="6_July_2007"> </div id>

6 July 2007 (Friday)

Baseball:
The Minnesota Twins sweep a doubleheader against the Chicago White Sox, 20–14 and 12–0. Minnesota's 32 runs are the most scored by a team in a doubleheader since 1939. Justin Morneau hits three home runs in Game 2. (AP via Yahoo)
Basketball:
William Jones Cup at Taipei, Republic of China:
 86–68 Universiade team 
 Athletes in Action 81–70 
 74–70 
 68–61 
 72–64 
Tennis: 2007 Wimbledon, London, England
Ladies' Singles Semifinals:
(23)  Venus Williams def. (6)  Ana Ivanovic, 6–2, 6–4
(18)  Marion Bartoli def. (1)  Justine Henin, 1–6, 7–5, 6–1

<div id="5_July_2007"> </div id>

5 July 2007 (Thursday)

Basketball:
William Jones Cup at Taipei, Republic of China:
 80–70 
 86–59 Universiade team  
 69–66 Athletes in Action 
 88–84 
 78–77 (OT)  – Lebanon's Fadi El Khatib missed two freethrows at the end of regulation to set up a three-pointer by Lin Chih-jay at the buzzer. At the end of OT, a put-back by Tsun Wen-Din after a missed three-pointer by Chen Hsin-an put them ahead 78–77; Rony Fahed missed a field-goal to win the game for the Taiwanese.
Cricket:
Bangladesh cricket team in Sri Lanka in 2007
2nd Test, 3rd Day:  451/6 (dec) beat  62 & 299 (86.2 ov.) by an innings and 90 runs

<div id="4_July_2007"> </div id>

4 July 2007 (Wednesday)

Competitive eating:
92nd Nathan's Hot Dog Eating Contest at Coney Island, New York City:
Joey Chestnut of San Jose, California upsets six-time champion Takeru Kobayashi by downing a record 66 hot dogs and buns in 12 minutes. (AP via Forbes)
Basketball:
William Jones Cup at Taipei, Republic of China:
 90–77 
 74–72 
 Universiade team 86–84  – The Philippines had another collapse at the end game as Yusuke Otada converted a layup via a fastbreak after a turnover with a second remaining.
 Athletes in Action 79–65 
 81–62 
Cricket:
Bangladesh cricket team in Sri Lanka in 2007
2nd Test, 2nd Day:  451/6 (dec) lead  62 & 69/4 (14 ov.) by 320 runs
 collapse to their lowest ever test score in the first innings
West Indian cricket team in England in 2007
 278/5 (50 ov.) beat  217 (46 ov.) by 61 runs
Rugby league:
In the final match of the 2007 State of Origin, New South Wales avoid a series whitewash by defeating Queensland 18–4 at Suncorp Stadium in Brisbane. Queensland had already secured the series win with victories in the first two matches.
Winter Olympic Games
Sochi, Russia is awarded the 2014 Winter Olympics.

<div id="3_July_2007"> </div id>

3 July 2007 (Tuesday)

2007 America's Cup:
America's Cup holders  Alinghi (SUI-100) retain the Cup in Valencia, Spain, defeating  Emirates Team New Zealand (NZL-92) by 1 second to secure a 5–2 victory in the best-of-nine final.
Baseball:
Barry Bonds home run record chase:
Bonds hits career home run No. 751, a two-run shot off Aaron Harang, in the first inning of the San Francisco Giants' 7–3 loss to the Cincinnati Reds at Great American Ball Park. He is now four homers shy of Hank Aaron.
Basketball:
William Jones Cup at Taipei, Republic of China:
 Athletes in Action 106–68 
 96–61 Universiade team 
 71–65 
 65–62 
 85–69 

<div id="2_July_2007"> </div id>

2 July 2007 (Monday)

Baseball:
MLB::
New York Yankees pitcher Roger Clemens achieves his 350th win in a 5–1 victory over the Minnesota Twins.
Basketball:
William Jones Cup at Taipei, Republic of China:
 63–61 
 80–71 
 70–69  – Kim Min-soo tipped in Yang Dong-guen's missed layup as the buzzer sounded to give Korea the come-from-behind win.
 72–67 Athletes in Action 
 90–77 Universiade team 

<div id="1_July_2007"> </div id>

1 July 2007 (Sunday)

Golf
U.S. Women's Open
Cristie Kerr won her first major championship with a two-stroke victory over Angela Park and Lorena Ochoa.
Auto racing:
Formula One: French Grand Prix at Magny-Cours.
(1) Kimi Räikkönen  (2) Felipe Massa  (3) Lewis Hamilton 
Champ Car: Grand Prix of Mont-Tremblant in Saint-Jovite, Quebec, Canada.
(1) Robert Doornbos  (2) Sébastien Bourdais  (3) Will Power 
NASCAR Nextel Cup: Lenox Industrial Tools 300 at Loudon, New Hampshire.
(1) Denny Hamlin  (2) Jeff Gordon  (3) Martin Truex Jr.
Cricket:
Pakistan in Scotland
Match abandoned without a ball bowled
2007 Future Cup
 152/4 (30.2/31 ov.) beat  148/7  (31/31 ov.) by 6 wickets
West Indian cricket team in England in 2007
 225 (49.5 ov.) beat  146 (39.5 ov.) by 79 runs
2007–08 ICC Intercontinental Cup
 297 & 310 beat  337/9 (dec) & 225 (70 ov.) by 45 runs
Ice hockey
NHL
Beginning of free agency, allowing teams to offer contracts, and sign free agents.

References

07